Implosion can refer to:

Physics
 Implosion (mechanical process)
 Building implosion
 Implosion-type nuclear weapon
 In phonetics, an airstream mechanism associated with implosive consonants
 Gravitational collapse (and more specifically, core collapse) in cosmology
 Parabolic implosion in complex dynamics

Art, entertainment and media

Books
 Implosion (novel), by D. F. Jones
Implosion, book by Kathy Acker Mark Magill 1983 
Implosion, romantic novel by Berinn Rae Crimson Romance 2013
Implosion, non-fiction book by Joel C. Rosenberg

Film and TV
Implosion, 1983 short film directed by E. Elias Merhige
Implosion, 2009 German film with Marie Tourell Søderberg
Implosion, 2011 German film with Eriq Ebouaney
Implosion, a 2016 film by Steven Woloshen

Music
 
Implosion, album by Cybotron (Australian band)  Aztec Music 2005
Implosion, album by False Prophets (band) Alternative Tentacles 1987 
 Implosions (album), album by Stephan Micus 1977
Implosions, album by Stanley Clarke 1987
Implosions, video album by Stanley Clarke 1987

Video games 
 Implosion - Never Lose Hope, a 2015 iOS game by Rayark

See also
Implode (disambiguation)